Yugorsk is a town in Khanty–Mansi Autonomous Okrug, Russia, located in the northwestern part of the East-West lowland,  from Khanty-Mansiysk. Population:

Geography
The relief in the town is flat. The town is surrounded by forests. The Ess River flows  from the town.

History

The settlement of Komsomolsky was built in 1962 to support timber and natural gas industries. The settlement grew as the gas fields of Western Siberia were being explored, and the production association Tyumentransgas (since 2007 GazpromTransgazYugorsk) developed. In March 1959, subdivisions of railway troops started the construction of the "Ivdel-Ob" railway.

The town was renamed Yugorsk in July 1992. The name originates from the name of the land "Yugra", or "Yugoria"—the place where the Khanty and Mansi peoples live.

Administrative and municipal status
Within the framework of administrative divisions, it is incorporated as the town of okrug significance of Yugorsk—an administrative unit with the status equal to that of the districts. As a municipal division, the town of okrug significance of Yugorsk is incorporated as Yugorsk Urban Okrug.

Employment
The OOO Gazprom transgaz Yugorsk gas company is based in Yugorsk.

References

Notes

Sources

Cities and towns in Khanty-Mansi Autonomous Okrug
Cities and towns built in the Soviet Union
Populated places established in 1962